Jon Jonsson i Källeräng  (1867–1939) was a Swedish politician. He was a member of the Centre Party.

References
This article was initially translated from the Swedish Wikipedia article.

Centre Party (Sweden) politicians
1867 births
1939 deaths